Carlos Alberto Ramon Rios (born 14 April 1971) is an Argentine professional boxer. He currently has 53 wins and 11 losses. Rios has fought in the super lightweight and featherweight division. Rios has fought for a world title on several occasions. In 1997 Rios fought Luisito Espinosa for the WBC featherweight title. He was defeated by TKO in the 6th round.

In 1999, Rios was defeated by Floyd Mayweather Jr. for the WBC super featherweight title. He later fought Acelino Freitas in 2000 for the WBO super featherweight title. The fight ended in a technical knockout after Rios' corner threw in the towel.

Professional boxing record

| style="text-align:center;" colspan="8"|53 wins (34 knockouts), 11 losses, 3 draws
|-  style="text-align:center; background:#e3e3e3;"
|  style="border-style:none none solid solid; "|Res.
|  style="border-style:none none solid solid; "|Record
|  style="border-style:none none solid solid; "|Opponent
|  style="border-style:none none solid solid; "|Type
|  style="border-style:none none solid solid; "|Rd., Time
|  style="border-style:none none solid solid; "|Date
|  style="border-style:none none solid solid; "|Location
|  style="border-style:none none solid solid; "|Notes
|- align=center
|Win
|53-11-3
|align=left| Rodolfo Sergio Javier Lauria
|
|
|
|align=left|
|align=left|
|- align=center
|Loss
|52-11-3
|align=left| Fabio Daniel Oliva
|
|
|
|align=left|
|align=left|
|- align=center
|Loss
|52-10-3
|align=left| Lovemore Ndou
|
|
|
|align=left|
|align=left|
|- align=center
|Win
|52-9-3
|align=left| Roberto David Arrieta
|
|
|
|align=left|
|align=left|
|- align=center
|Draw
|51-9-3
|align=left| Pablo Ramon Barbero
|
|
|
|align=left|
|align=left|
|- align=center
|Loss
|51-9-2
|align=left| Jorge Rodrigo Barrios
|
|
|
|align=left|
|align=left|
|- align=center

References

External links
 BoxRec profile

1971 births
Living people
Argentine male boxers
Featherweight boxers